László Sáry (born Győrasszonyfa, Hungary, 1 January 1940) is a Hungarian composer and pianist.  In the 1970s he began composing in a minimal style. He received recognition in 2002 for having created the scores for numerous animated works and was awarded a prize by the Kecskemét Animation Film Festival Jury for Best Music.

Influence
A libre art composition published in 2018 under Sáry's influence for marimba and more instruments. (by the libre art composer Attila Szervác)
 2002.

References

External links
László Sáry page at Budapest Music Center website
László Sáry home page

1940 births
20th-century classical composers
21st-century classical composers
Hungarian classical composers
Hungarian male classical composers
Living people
20th-century Hungarian male musicians
21st-century Hungarian male musicians